The 47th Brigade was a formation of British Army. It was part of the new army also known as Kitchener's Army. It was assigned to the 16th (Irish) Division and served on the Western Front during the First World War. Philip Miles of the Indian Army briefly commanded this brigade.

As the 47th (London) Brigade, it was part of the 56th London Division/District in the 1960s.

Units in the First World War
The infantry battalions did not all serve at once, but all were assigned to the brigade during the war.

6th Battalion, Royal Irish Regiment
6th Battalion, Connaught Rangers
7th Battalion, Leinster Regiment
8th Battalion, Royal Munster Fusiliers
1st Battalion, Royal Munster Fusiliers
2nd Battalion, Leinster Regiment
14th Battalion, Leicestershire Regiment
6/7th Battalion, Royal Scots Fusiliers
9th Battalion, Black Watch
18th Battalion, Welsh Regiment
47th Machine Gun Company 	
47th Trench Mortar Battery

References

Infantry brigades of the British Army in World War I
Military units and formations established in 1914